Hunkt, also called Hanlong and Huatong, is a Chinese automobile manufacturer that specializes in developing SUVs. It was founded by Zotye Auto.

History 
Hunkt was founded in 2016, and is located in Daye, Hubei, China. They have founded partnerships with Bosch, ZF, Mitsubishi, Valeo, Horse, BorgWarner, Tenneco, Delphi, Marelli, and United Automotive Electronics. Hunkt built a 1,200 acre factory area that cost 1 billion yuan.

The Hunkt Canticie was their first vehicle. It is powered by a 2.0-litre turbo engine that gives  horsepower and a  top speed. It has rear-wheel drive and 8-speed automatic transmission. The regular edition costs 126.800 yuan, and the extended version costs 179.800 yuan. It has similar design features to a Land Rover.

Vehicles

Current Models 
Hunkt has 1 production vehicles.

See also 
Fukang
Evergrande

References 

Electric vehicle manufacturers of China
Car brands
Car manufacturers of China
Chinese brands